Kosmochlor is a rare chromium sodium clinopyroxene with the chemical formula NaCr3+Si2O6.

The name is from German kosmisch, for its occurrence in meteorites, and the Greek chlor, for green. It was first reported in 1897 from the Toluca meteorite, Jiquipilco, Mexico.

It occurs as a major constituent of some jadeitites and as an accessory mineral of some iron meteorites. Associated minerals include cliftonite (graphite), chromian diopside, troilite at Toluca; daubreelite, krinovite, roedderite, high albite, richterite, chromite (Canyon Diablo); and jadeite, chromite and chlorite (Burma).

References

Silicate minerals
Monoclinic minerals
Minerals in space group 15